Amanda Hocking (born July 12, 1984) is an American writer of paranormal romance young adult fiction.

Early life
Hocking was born and raised in Austin, Minnesota. After high school, she studied Human Services while working in a group home for people with disabilities.

Career
While employed as a group home worker, she wrote 17 novels in her free time. Hocking left her employment as a group home worker and started self-publishing in 2010, at the age of 25. She's since published over twenty novels, several of which made the New York Times Bestseller list.

In April 2010, she began self-publishing her novels as e-books. By March 2011, she had sold over a million copies of her first nine books and earned two million dollars from sales, previously unheard of for self-published authors.  In early 2011, Hocking averaged 9,000 book sales each day.

Work
Hocking's published work, originally self-published, consists of My Blood Approves, a vampire romance series; the Trylle Trilogy, which covers a teenage girl's journey of self-discovery in an urban fantasy setting; and Hollowland, a zombie novel. The New York Times characterized her novels as "part quirky girl-like-Hocking characters, part breakneck pacing, part Hollywood-style action, and part bodice-ripping romance – they are literature as candy, a mash-up of creativity and commerce."

In March 2011, Hocking signed her first conventional publishing contract for four books, for two million dollars, with St. Martin's Press.
It concerns her new young-adult paranormal series called Watersong. Book one, Wake, was released in August 2012. All three books in her previously self-published Trylle Trilogy were also sold to St. Martin's Press, and have been re-released from January–April 2012. In 2015 Hocking announced she had signed a new three-book deal with St. Martin's and revealed that the books would be a standalone and a duology, respectively. The standalone called Freeks set around a traveling circus in the 1980s, was published in January 2017, while the duology to be based on Norse Mythology about Valkyries is set for a 2017 release.

Bibliography
My Blood Approves series:
My Blood Approves (March 27, 2010)
Fate (April 15, 2010)
Flutter (May 25, 2010)
Wisdom (August 22, 2010)
Letters to Elise: A Peter Townsend Novella (December 19, 2010)
 Swear (November 9, 2016)
Trylle Trilogy
Switched (self published 2010, with St. Martin's January 24, 2012)
Torn (self published 2010, with St. Martin's February 28, 2012)
Ascend (self published 2011, with St. Martin's April 24, 2012)
The Hollows series:
Hollowland (October 5, 2010)
Hollowmen (November 8, 2011)
Virtue (May 27, 2011)
Watersong series
 Forgotten Lyrics (October 30, 2012)
 Wake (August 7, 2012)
Lullaby (November 27, 2012)
Tidal (June 4, 2013)
Elegy (August 6, 2013)
The Kanin Chronicles
Frostfire (January 2015)
Ice Kissed (May 2015)
Crystal Kingdom (August 2015)
Freeks (January 3, 2017)
Valkyrie
 Between the Blade and the Heart (January 2, 2018)
 From the Earth to the Shadows (March 27, 2018)
The Omte Origins 
The Lost City (2020)
The Morning Flower (2020)
The Ever After (2021)
Bestow the Darkness (2021)
Seven Fallen Hearts Saga 
Virtue (2021)
Tristitia (2022)
Superbia (coming late 2022)

Adaptations
In February 2011, the Trylle Trilogy was optioned for a film, with Terri Tatchell writing the screenplay. As of 2015 the rights have reverted to Hocking, with no prospects for future development.

Personal life
Hocking lives in Rochester, Minnesota with her husband and step-son.

References

External links

 Amanda Hocking's blog and website
 Amanda Hocking's Smashwords Author Profile

1984 births
21st-century American novelists
21st-century American women writers
Novelists from Minnesota
American writers of young adult literature
American fantasy writers
American women novelists
American romantic fiction writers
American women bloggers
American bloggers
Living people
People from Austin, Minnesota
Women science fiction and fantasy writers
Women romantic fiction writers
Women writers of young adult literature